The Liberal Democrats are a political party in the United Kingdom. Party members elect the leader of the Liberal Democrats, the head and highest-ranking member of the party. Liberal Democrat members of Parliament also elect a deputy leader of the Parliamentary Party in the House of Commons, often colloquially referred to as the deputy leader. Under the federal constitution of the Liberal Democrats the leader is required to be a member of the House of Commons.

Before the election of the first federal leader of the party (the Liberal Democrats having a federal structure in their internal party organisation), the leaders of the two parties which merged to form the Liberal Democrats, the Liberal Party and the Social Democratic Party (SDP), served as joint interim leaders: David Steel and Bob Maclennan respectively.

If the leader dies, resigns or loses their seat in Parliament, the deputy leader (if there is one) serves as interim leader until a leadership election takes place. This has occurred three times, with Menzies Campbell serving as interim leader following the resignation of Charles Kennedy (Campbell was elected leader in the ensuing election) and Vince Cable serving as interim leader following Campbell's resignation. Jo Swinson lost her seat in the general election held on 12 December 2019, thus ceasing to be leader; Deputy Leader Ed Davey and Party President Sal Brinton became acting co-leaders. Brinton was replaced by Mark Pack following his assuming the office of party president on 1 January 2020. Davey won the Leadership election and became Leader on 27 August 2020 at the 2020 Liberal Democrats leadership election.

Leaders

Timeline

Leaders in the House of Lords

See also

 List of United Kingdom Whig and allied party leaders (1801–59)
 Leader of the Conservative Party (UK)
 Leader of the Labour Party (UK)
 Leader of the Liberal Party (UK)

Notes

References

Sources
 Federal Constitution of the Liberal Democrats

External links
Liberal Democrat History Group

 
Liberal Democrats